The discography of South Korean girl group Brown Eyed Girls consists of seven studio albums, three extended plays, one compilation album and eighteen singles. In 16 years of activities, they ranked in top 5 artists having the most digital hit songs over the past decade.

Albums

Studio albums

Cover albums

Compilation albums

Extended plays

Singles

Other charted songs

References

Discographies of South Korean artists
Discography
K-pop music group discographies